Raymond Burns may refer to:
Raymond Burns (golfer), professional golfer from Northern Ireland
Raymond Burns (illustrator) who illustrated Mel Lyle's Power Boys series
Captain Sensible, English rock musician, real name Raymond Burns